Shelly Andre Brooks (born January 22, 1969) is an American serial killer who murdered at least seven women in Detroit, Michigan, from 2001 to 2006, though he is suspected of up to 20 murders and possibly more. He was caught thanks to a survivor and fully admitted his guilt at his trials, for which he was given multiple life sentences without the possibility of parole.

Early life 
Brooks was born on January 22, 1969, in Detroit, Michigan, but later raised in Ann Arbor, around 40–50 miles from Detroit. His father neglected him, and when he was 4, his mother left the family, leaving him in the hands of his grandparents. Brooks was reported to be angry at his mother throughout his childhood, though he never saw her again after she left the family. Throughout his early years, Brooks showed signs of low intelligence.

Murders 
As victims, Brooks targeted middle-aged female prostitutes or homeless drug addicts. He committed his crimes around the city of Detroit, dumping their bodies in abandoned buildings and houses. He was able to easily win his victims trust because of his own life on the streets. He started killing at age 32 in 2001, and throughout the next five years, he would kill at least six more women until 2006, at age 36. He is suspected of up to 20+ murders from as early as 1999.

Methods 
Brooks would take his victims to abandoned buildings and houses, where he sexually assaulted them and beat them to death with rocks. He left his victims bodies in the same abandoned buildings he lured them into. His victims ranged from 30 to 54.

Victims 
Full list of Brooks' known victims

Arrest, Exposure and Trial
On June 26, 2006, Brooks was arrested for sexually assaulting a woman. After his arrest, his DNA was transferred into a database in an effort to possibly connect him to any unsolved cold cases. Authorities had their first hit after they successfully linked him to the 2002 slaying of Pamela Greer. Thanks to further research, they exposed his involvement in the other murders. In 2007, he was found guilty and was sentenced to two terms of life imprisonment. He is currently imprisoned at the G. Robert Cotton Correctional Facility in Jackson Michigan.

See also 
 List of homicides in Michigan
 List of serial killers in the United States

References

Links 

1969 births
2001 murders in the United States
2002 murders in the United States
2005 murders in the United States
20th-century African-American people
20th-century American criminals
African-American people
American male criminals
American people convicted of murder
American prisoners sentenced to life imprisonment
American rapists
American serial killers
Crimes against sex workers in the United States
Criminals from Michigan
Living people
Male serial killers
People convicted of murder by Michigan
Prisoners sentenced to life imprisonment by Michigan
Violence against women in the United States
People from Detroit
People from Ann Arbor, Michigan